Kents Lagoon is a rural locality in the Scenic Rim Region, Queensland, Australia.

Geography 
In the south-east of the locality elevations rise to 140 m at Obum Obum Hill.  Warrill Creek marks the western boundary of Kents Lagoon. To the east of Warril Creek lies Kents Lagoon.

History 
The lagoon was named by Ludwig Leichhardt after F. Kent, the then owner of Fassifern station.

Irrigated farms of  first went to auction in January 1906 as part of the Kent's Lagoon Paddock Estate. The estate was bounded by Warrill Creek to the west, the now closed Mundbilla railway station to the north-east, and Main Road (now Munbilla Road) to the east.

The Mount Edwards railway line opened in 1922 and closed in 1960. The locality was served by the Waraperta railway station on Munbilla Road.

The locality contains 24 households, in which 51.6% of the population are males and 48.4% of the population are females with a median age of 38, the same as the national average. The average weekly household income is $1,624, $186 above the national average.

References

External links 

Scenic Rim Region
Localities in Queensland